Joose Antonen (born 28 April 1995) is a Finnish professional ice hockey player who currently plays with KooKoo of the Liiga.

Antonen made his Liiga debut playing with JYP Jyväskylä during the 2012-13 Liiga season.

His elder brother Juuso was also a professional ice hockey player, now retired.

References

External links

1995 births
Living people
Ilves players
JYP-Akatemia players
JYP Jyväskylä players
KooKoo players
Lukko players
Finnish ice hockey forwards
Ice hockey people from Tampere